Lanark Racecourse railway station served the town of Lanark (specifically Lanark Racecourse), in the historical county of Lanarkshire, Scotland, from 1910 to 1968 on the Douglas Branch.

History 
The station was opened on 27 September 1910 by the Caledonian Railway, although it was used earlier for the airshow on 9 August 1910. It didn't appear in the timetable. It was used by the military as well as race goers. The signal box was situated on the northbound platform. 'Halt' was added to the station's name in the 1941 edition of the handbook of stations. The station closed to passengers on 27 September 1964. The signal box closed in 1965. The station continued to be used for goods traffic and military personnel until 15 January 1968. Only portions of the platforms remain. The rest of the site is overgrown.

References 

Disused railway stations in South Lanarkshire
Former Caledonian Railway stations
Beeching closures in Scotland
Railway stations in Great Britain opened in 1910
Railway stations in Great Britain closed in 1964
1910 establishments in Scotland
1968 disestablishments in Scotland